Sanford Morton "Sandy" Grossman (June 12, 1935 – April 2, 2014) was an American sports television director. He directed television broadcasts of 10 Super Bowls, 18 NBA Finals, 5 Stanley Cup finals and Olympic hockey matches. He won eight Emmy Awards for his directing.

He was born on June 12, 1935, in Newark, New Jersey. After graduating from Weequahic High School, he studied broadcasting at the University of Alabama, where he called football games for the school radio station. He graduated in 1957 and wanted to pursue a career in the communication industry, but believed he did not have the right voice to be a broadcaster. Grossman worked as an usher for the Ed Sullivan Theater for several years before obtaining employment at the local CBS station, Channel 2. In 1963, he became a production assistant for CBS Sports. He was the chief director of broadcasting NBA games during the early 1970s and soon became the main NFL director. Grossmann innovated using music at the break of basketball games, and after he played "The Hustle" by Van McCoy, McCoy sent him a gold record in thanks of his promotion.

Grossman began working alongside John Madden and Pat Summerall on CBS in 1981, and their partnership lasted 21 seasons. Madden insisted that Grossman and producer Bob Stenner watch coaches’ films of the NFL teams, which helped Grossman choose the best shots to pair with Madden's commentary. Madden credits him for being the first director to widen the camera shot to incorporate footage of outside linebackers. He created these broadcasts out of a production truck crammed with television monitors that formed a screen shot. During a Giants-Bengals game in 1991, Stenner and Grossman made 1,100 decisions about camera angles and the like.

Summerall and Madden decided to move to Fox Sports after that network acquired broadcasting rights to NFL games in 1994, and Grossman followed suit. He retired in 2012. That year, the Elite Football League of India hired Grossman to teach its camera crews how to cover the American sport. “There were some guys who couldn’t follow the players,” he said. “I said, ‘Get the kicker,’ and some of them didn’t know where to find him.”.

Grossman died on April 2, 2014 in Boca Raton, Florida. The stated cause of death was cancer. He was survived by his wife, Faithe; sons Bobby and Dean; daughters, Jodi Grossman Rose and Bari Grossman Rosenholtz; and eight grandchildren; Alexa, Jordyn, Kaylie, Paige, Adam, Reese, Eliya, and Zachary. John Madden said about Grossman: “Sandy became like a defensive coordinator, the way he looked at stuff. If they go slot, if they bunch their receivers on one side and they break off — he had a plan for everything, and when it happens, boom, boom, boom, you’re right there. Sandy took the knowledge he got from the film and transferred it to the cameramen, who carried it over to the game.”

References

External links
 

American directors
1935 births
2014 deaths
People from Newark, New Jersey
University of Alabama alumni
Weequahic High School alumni